The 2019–20 West Indies Championship was the 54th edition of the Regional Four Day Competition, the domestic first-class cricket competition for the countries of the Cricket West Indies (CWI). The previous edition of the tournament was known as the Regional Four Day Competition before being rebranded by CWI. The competition started on 9 January 2020 and was scheduled to conclude on 5 April 2020. Six teams contested the tournament – Barbados, Guyana, Jamaica, the Leeward Islands, Trinidad and Tobago, and the Windward Islands. Guyana were the defending champions.

On 13 March 2020, Cricket West Indies suspended the tournament, for a minimum of 30 days, due to the COVID-19 pandemic. On 24 March 2020, Cricket West Indies cancelled the final two rounds of fixtures, and named Barbados as the tournament winners, after they finished top of the group.

Points table

 Champions

Fixtures

Round 1

Round 2

Round 3

Round 4

Round 5

Round 6

Round 7

Round 8

Round 9

Round 10

References

External links
 Series home at ESPN Cricinfo

2020 in West Indian cricket
Regional Four Day Competition seasons
West Indies Championship
West Indies Championship
West Indies Championship